Centennial School District is a school district in the U.S. state of Oregon. It serves the cities of Gresham and southeast Portland, with an enrollment of approximately 6,700 students.

Demographics 
In the 2009 school year, the district had 109 students classified as homeless by the Department of Education, or 1.6% of students in the district.

Elementary schools 
Butler Creek - Gresham
Meadows - Portland
Patrick Lynch - Portland
Powell Butte - Portland
Parklane- Portland
Pleasant Valley - Gresham

Middle schools 
Centennial Middle School - Portland
Oliver Middle School - Portland

High schools 
Centennial High School - Gresham
Centennial Park School - Portland

School name controversy 
On August 9, 2017, the Centennial School District Board voted in favor of renaming three of its elementary schools, Lynch Meadows, Lynch View, and Lynch Wood. The reason given behind the move was that the name "Lynch," the surname of a family that donated land for the schools over a hundred years earlier, reminded people of the act of lynching and racial connotations related to it. The board decided to change Lynch View's name to Patrick Lynch Elementary while Lynch Meadows and Lynch Wood would drop "Lynch" from their names pending a decision for new permanent names.

References

External links 
Centennial School District

School districts in Oregon
Education in Multnomah County, Oregon
Education in Gresham, Oregon